Spirit Lake is a 1961 novel by MacKinlay Kantor. It is set in Iowa during the era of Manifest Destiny, and depicts the epoch through a patchwork of numerous characters, families, and factions. The book comes to a climax with the Spirit Lake Massacre.

References

1961 novels
Iowa in fiction
Novels set in Iowa